Abdullah Noor Wasughe (born 13 December 1947) is a Somali former high jumper who competed in the 1972 Summer Olympics. He also won the 1970, 1971 and 1972 East and Central African Championships and the 1973 All-Africa Games.

His personal best jump was 2.05 metres, achieved in 1972.

References

1947 births
Living people
Somalian high jumpers
Olympic athletes of Somalia
Athletes (track and field) at the 1972 Summer Olympics
Male high jumpers
Somalian male athletes
African Games gold medalists for Somalia
African Games medalists in athletics (track and field)
Athletes (track and field) at the 1973 All-Africa Games